Atolinga is the seat of Atolinga Municipality in the Mexican state of Zacatecas, located in its southwestern portion.

The coordinates of the municipal seat of Atolinga are 21° 44’ 15” north and 103° 28’ 30” west.  The town is located at 2,250 meters above sea level and the municipality covers an area of 280 square kilometers.

The municipality rests on a mesa that is the western border of the Tlaltenango Valley.  The Atolinga River, which runs through the municipal seat is a tributary of the Bolaños River.
A 2005 Census recorded 1,453 residents.

History 

Prior to the arrival of the Spanish to the area, the region around Atolinga was inhabited by indigenous people of the Caxcan and Tepecan ethnic groups.  The first Spanish contact with these people must have been in 1530 when Pedro Almíndez Chirino went through the Valley of Tlaltenango on a northbound expedition.

The first land grantee of the area was Pedro Sernosa, who later sold his land to Juan Fernández de Jara Quemada.

The town formed part of the jurisdiction of Tlaltenango for both ecclesiastical purposes and governmental purposes until the beginning of the 1800s.  In 1814, a plea was made by the citizenry that the community be granted its own town council and status as a municipality due to the long distance from the municipal seat and the ascending local population.  The plea spells out that the town counted with nearly 700 "souls" and that within a radius of two leagues lived more than 3,700 people.

In recent decades, Atolinga's population has decreased due to emigration.  Migrants from Atolinga can be found throughout the United States, especially in Chicago, Indianapolis, Atlanta, and the San Gabriel Valley region of California.  Journalist Sam Quinones has written about such migrants in his book Antonio's Gun and Delfino's Dream: True Tales of Mexican Migration.

Sources 
 Enciclopedia de los Municipios de Zacatecas, State of Zacatecas
 Insituto Nacional de Estadística, Geografía e Informática
 www.samquinones.com

Populated places in Zacatecas